South Morang was a steam-era railway station on the Whittlesea line, which operated until the closure of the line beyond Lalor station on 28 November 1959, following the electrification of the line to Lalor. The line to Epping station was electrified and re-opened on 30 November 1964, and the remaining section of track, from Epping to Whittlesea, was dismantled in the 1970s, although the former right-of-way remained intact. All that remained of the original South Morang station was the platform mound.

A new South Morang station opened on 22 April 2012, at the terminus of an extension of the Epping line. The new station was two kilometres closer to Epping than the former station, being arguably in Mill Park or Epping.

Middle Gorge railway station opened on the actual site of the original South Morang station on 26 August 2018, as part of the extension of the line to Mernda. A few local residents, unhappy with the "Middle Gorge" name, advocated that it be renamed South Morang, and the new South Morang station renamed Plenty Valley, but the idea was rejected by the state government.

References

Railway stations in Australia opened in 1889
Disused railway stations in Melbourne